The American International School Vienna (AISV) is a non-profit international school in Vienna, Austria. AIS Vienna is accredited by the Middle States Association of Schools and Colleges, USA, and the Council of International Schools, and is recognized by the Austrian Ministry of Education.

Students 
AIS Vienna serves approximately eight hundred students from sixty countries, with about half of the total American or Austrian. The school is divided into three divisions—Elementary (Pre-Kindergarten to Grade 5), Middle (Grade 6, 7, and 8), and High School (Grade 9 to Grade 12). The typical class has twenty students, with many language classes considerably smaller.

The average stay at AIS is 3 years, with approximately 200 new students admitted each year.

The international parent community is predominantly affiliated with embassies, international organizations, and international corporations. Local parents tend to work in private businesses or such professions as medicine and law.

Faculty 
Each of the three academic divisions is headed by a Principal. In addition, the Senior Leadership Team includes the School Director, the Director of Athletics, Activities, and Events, the Director of Technology, the Director of Admissions, the Business Manager, and the Director of Teaching and Learning. There are also counselors in each of the three divisions and librarians for the Elementary and Secondary schools. A full-time nurse-practitioner oversees the school's health unit.

The school is divided into several areas: the Elementary School, the Middle School, the High School, the villa, and the gyms. The school has 4 gyms, one field, 
two libraries, one theater and one amphitheater. There are 17 staircases in the building, and there is no handicapped accessibility.

The teaching faculty numbers over 100 individuals. Over 70% of teachers hold advanced degrees, with several having earned doctorates. A substantial majority are U.S. citizens, but the school does have teachers of other nationalities, including faculty from Europe, Canada, the Middle East, the Far East, and South America.

AIS faculty range in age from 27-65, with an average and median age of about 46. The average stay of a teacher at AIS is over ten years.

Notable faculty include Jonathan Carroll.

Facilities 
AIS Vienna's 11 acre (4.5 ha) campus overlooks the city and is adjacent to the Vienna Woods and the Neustift vineyards. Made up of seven adjoining buildings, the campus features libraries, a cafeteria, sports facilities, eight science laboratories, art and music studios, a theater, an outdoor amphitheater, and an outdoor classroom. The city of Vienna makes up the ‘extended campus’.

The land for the school was bought by the U.S. government in the late 1950s, using U.S. government funds obtained through the Marshall Plan. The school occupies the premises in perpetuity. The school is built along a sloping hillside. AIS Vienna is not easily accessed by students or parents with physical challenges.

Classrooms are equipped with interactive whiteboards, Elementary students have ample access to laptops and iPads, and beginning with Grade 4, students are given their own laptops each year. The campus features a wireless internet and printing network, and teachers work with e-learning platforms.

Notable alumni 

Bryan Adams, Grammy Award-winning Canadian musician
Left Boy, Austrian musician
 Oskar Deutsch (born 1963), entrepreneur and President of the Jewish Community of Vienna 
James Hersey, Austrian-American musician
Niko Kranjcar, Croatian football player 
Alexander Pschill, Actor 
Shabnam Rezaei, Children's Television Writer, Producer, Director Big Bad Boo Studios
Thomas G. Stemberg, American businessman and inventor, co-founder of Staples Inc

References

External links
 Official School Site

Vienna
International schools in Vienna
Private schools in Austria
International Baccalaureate schools in Austria
Educational institutions established in 1959
1959 establishments in Austria